Thomas Russell may refer to:

Politicians
 Thomas Russell (MP for Melcombe Regis), 1384–1390, MP for Melcombe Regis
Thomas Russell (fl. 1417–1433), MP for Midhurst, Chichester, Reigate and East Grinstead (England)
 Thomas Russell (died 1574), MP for Worcestershire
 Thomas Russell (died 1632) (1577–1632), English politician who sat in the House of Commons in 1601
 Thomas Russell (MP for Truro), in 1614
 Sir Thomas Russell, Custos Rotulorum of Worcestershire, c. 1573–1574
 Thomas Russell (New Zealand politician) (1830–1904), lawyer, businessman and politician
 Thomas Russell (Glasgow MP) (1836–1911), British Member of Parliament for Buteshire and Glasgow
 Sir Thomas Russell, 1st Baronet (1841–1920), Irish politician
 Thomas Russell (mayor), Ashland, Kentucky, USA

Judges
 Thomas B. Russell (born 1945), U.S. federal judge
 Thomas Russell (Massachusetts judge) (1825–1887), American state court judge and ambassador
 Patrick Russell (judge) (Thomas Patrick Russell, 1926–2002), judge of the High Court of England and Wales

Others
 Thomas Russell (cricketer) (1863–1927), English cricketer
Tom Russell (footballer, born 1909) (1909–1975), Scottish footballer
 Thomas Russell (rebel) (1767–1803), Irish activist, co-founder and leader of the United Irishmen
 Thomas O'Neill Russell (1828–1908), Irish novelist
 Thomas Macnamara Russell (died 1824), admiral in the Royal Navy
 Thomas Russell (minister) (1781–1846), English independent minister
 Thomas Russell (poet) (1762–1788), English poet
 Thomas Wentworth Russell (1879–1954), police officer in the Egyptian service
 Thomas A. Russell (1858–1938), American attorney and law clerk to the justices of the Supreme Court
 Tom Russell (ice hockey) (born 1929), Canadian ice hockey player 
 Thomas J. Russell (born 1933), American engineer and businessman
 Tom Russell (born 1947/8), American singer-songwriter
 Tom Russell (DJ) (born 1948), Scottish rock music broadcaster and writer